Events from the year 2005 in the United Arab Emirates.

Incumbents
President: Khalifa bin Zayed Al Nahyan 
Prime Minister: Maktoum bin Rashid Al Maktoum

Foundations
ALHOSN University.

References

 
Years of the 21st century in the United Arab Emirates
United Arab Emirates
United Arab Emirates
2000s in the United Arab Emirates